United Nations Security Council Resolution 21, adopted unanimously at the 124 meeting of the Security Council on April 2, 1947, placed the former German Pacific Islands north of the Equator, which were formerly mandated to Japan by the League of Nations, under the Trusteeship System. The Security Council declared 16 Articles under which it had approved the terms. It declared the United States to be the Administering Authority and gave it permission to militarise the territory.

See also
List of United Nations Security Council Resolutions 1 to 100 (1946–1953)
Trust Territory of the Pacific Islands

References

External links
 

 0021
 0021
 0021
 0021
 0021
 0021
 0021
 0021
 0021
 0021
1947 in Nauru
1947 in the Federated States of Micronesia
1947 in the Marshall Islands
1947 in Japan
1947 in the United States
April 1947 events